Frank Joseph Morze, Jr.  (March 21, 1933 – May 28, 2006) was an American football center and tackle in the National Football League (NFL) for the San Francisco 49ers and Cleveland Browns.

Career
A native of Gardner, Morze graduated from Gardner High School in 1951, where he played basketball, football, and track and field. He went on to attend Boston College, where he played college football under Mike Holovak from 1951 to 1954. Morze started in all four years, and was given All-East and Catholic All-America honors, as well as being named the team's most valuable player in his final year. He graduated from the school in 1955.

Morze was selected in the 1955 NFL Draft by the San Francisco 49ers as the 21st overall pick. However, he did not begin playing for the team until the 1957 NFL season under Frankie Albert and later Red Hickey. Morze spent two years as a lieutenant in the United States Marine Corps, stationed at Camp Lejeune. The 1957 season marked the first playoff appearance in 49ers franchise history, and was Morze's only playoff appearance in his career. He played regularly for the team at the center position, until moving to the Cleveland Browns for the 1962 season under Paul Brown. He would rejoin the 49ers for the 1964 season under Hickey again, but then retired.

In 1981, Morze moved to Nevada with his wife, Nancy, and three children: David, Michael, and Suzanne. Morze started his own metal fabrication business in Las Vegas called Silver State Steel. In 1996, Morze was inducted into the Boston College Varsity Club Athletic Hall of Fame Morze died in Nevada in 2006 after battling with heart disease.

See also
List of Boston College Eagles in the NFL draft

References

External links
Boston College bio

1933 births
2006 deaths
People from Gardner, Massachusetts
United States Marines
American football offensive linemen
Boston College Eagles football players
San Francisco 49ers players
Cleveland Browns players